Liranaftate (trade name Zefnart) is a topical antifungal drug.  It is used as a 2% cream used to treat tinea pedis (athlete's foot), tinea corporis (ringworm), and tinea cruris (jock itch).  It was approved for use in Japan in August 2000.

Liranaftate works by inhibiting the fungal enzyme squalene epoxidase that is necessary for the fungus to synthesize sterols which are essential for cell membrane integrity.

References

Thiocarbamates
Antifungals
Tetralins
Pyridines
Methoxy compounds